Crematogaster algirica is a species of ant in tribe Crematogastrini. It was described by Hippolyte Lucas in 1849.

References

algirica
Insects described in 1849